Haivision is a Canadian company focused on developing video streaming technology. Haivision is headquartered in Montreal and Chicago with about 250 employees and 7 offices around the world, including one in Rendsburg, Germany. Haivision has additionally been credited with the development and maintenance of the Secure Reliable Transport (SRT) protocol, along with the associated SRT Alliance. Notable members of the SRT Alliance include Microsoft, Alibaba, and Harmonic.

About 
Haivision was founded in 2004. Haivision specializes in video encoding technology to help transmit low-latency video over a given network. In 2009, Haivision acquired Video Furnace, expanding its product offerings to include campus (LAN) based  IPTV and VOD services. In 2010, Haivision purchased CoolSign, which claimed to provide scalable digital signage solutions.  Following the 2011 acquisition of Kulabyte Corporation, Haivision gained encoding and transcoding technologies for over-the-top media distribution. In October 2019, Haivision acquired LightFlow Media Technologies. In August 2021, Haivision completed the acquisition of CineMassive.

Markets 
The London Olympics 2012 Games were streamed live using Haivision technologies. The Masters, MTV Movie Awards, major universities and other organizations also stream video using Haivision technology.

Awards 
 Streaming Media Readers' Choice Awards 2019: Makito X4 - Best Single or Dual Stream Encoding Appliance
Emmy® Award for Technology and Engineering in 2018: Secure Reliable Transport (SRT)
Streaming Media European Readers' Choice Awards 2013: HyperStream Live Cloud Transcoder 
 Streaming Media West Readers' Choice Awards 2012: Makito encoder and HyperStream Live streaming solution 
 AV Technology 2012 End-User Awards – Furnace IP Video System 6 Finalist for Best AV over IP system
 STAR Award for Superior Technology – Haivision Kulabyte 4.0 Live Transcoder 
 Most Innovative Video Extension Product - Haivision Makito Encoder 
 Best Video Broadcast or Video Streaming Product - Haivision Network Video KulaByte Live Internet Streaming 
 Streaming Media Readers' Choice Award 2011 – Haivision's KulaByte  
 Deloitte's 2011 Technology Fast 500
 TVB Europe and IBC Daily's "Best of IBC2011" Award – Haivision's KulaByte and HyperStream
 Deloitte Technology Fast 50 - Haivision winner of Companies-to-Watch-Award, 2009

References 

Companies based in Montreal
Companies listed on the Toronto Stock Exchange
Technology companies of Canada
Companies established in 2004
2004 establishments in Quebec
2020 initial public offerings
Video equipment manufacturers